Inkubus is a 2011 horror film produced by the Woodhaven Production Company, written by Carl Dupré, and directed by Glenn Ciano.  The film stars Robert Englund, William Forsythe, Joey Fatone, Jonathan Silverman, Dyan Kane, Mike Cerrone, Tom Denucci, and Michelle Ray Smith.

Plot
'Inʞubus' tells the story of a skeleton crew working the final shift at a soon-to-be demolished police station in Wood Haven, Rhode Island. The night takes a gruesome turn when the demon, Inkubus (Robert Englund), calmly walks into the station holding the severed head of a murdered girl.  Inkubus toys with the crew, allowing himself to be restrained, and begins to proudly confess to his litany of crimes, some dating back to the Middle Ages. Inkubus has a score to settle with the one detective (William Forsythe) that almost put him away some thirteen years ago.  To their dismay, the cops quickly become pawns in Inkubus’ brutal crowning achievement of murder, gore, and mayhem.

Cast
Robert Englund as Inkubus
William Forsythe as Detective Diamante
Jonathan Silverman as Tech
Joey Fatone as Detective Caretti
Michelle Ray Smith as Cole
Mike Cerrone as Mudge
Tom DeNucci as Pax
Kevin DeCristofano as Miles "The Headless Horseman" Coogan
Dyan Kane as Dr. Emily Winstrom
Tom Paolino as Meat

Production
Inkubus was filmed in Cranston, Rhode Island.  It was produced by The Woodhaven Production Company, a fully funded film production company that started by established Rhode Island businessman and entrepreneur Chad A. Verdi.  The original screenplay was written by Carl Dupre and developed with Glenn Ciano, writer of Homie Spumoni, who also directed and produced the feature.

Ciano cited 1980s horror films as an influence.

Release
Inkubus had a limited theatrical release, on October 31, 2011.  It was released on DVD and video on demand on February 21, 2012  through Screen Media Films.

Reception

Rotten Tomatoes does not have enough reviews for any consensus.

In a positive review, Scott Hallam of Dread Central called Inkubus imperfect but entertaining, rating it 3.5/5.  Bloody Disgusting was less enthusiastic, rating it a 2/5.

References

External links
 
 
 
 https://web.archive.org/web/20100523162345/http://www.verdicorrenteproductions.com/

2011 films
American supernatural horror films
2011 horror films
2010s English-language films
2010s American films